Benin has varied resources of wildlife comprising flora and fauna, which are primarily protected in its two contiguous protected areas of the Pendjari National Park and W National Park. The former is known for many species of avifauna and the latter park is rich in mammals and predators. In addition, many other forest reserves are noted in the country but are not easily accessible, well protected or adequately surveyed for its wildlife resources. The protected area of Benin which is defined as a National Protected Area System is in northern Benin, mostly with a woody savanna ecosystem. It covers 10.3% of the nation and is part of the three-nation W-Arly-Pendjari Complex (WAP) (which is 43% in Benin, 36% in Burkina Faso and 21% in Niger). 
 
These forests are found along river banks consisting of semi-deciduous, dry, and open forest and woodland savanna. However, these systems have been subject to severe misuse by way of deforestation, which necessitated the enforcement of a law, which imposes restrictions on cutting of these forests.

In south Benin, where malaria is a common disease as in the rest of Africa, medicinal plants are used for treatment as a form of traditional or alternative medicine.

National parks

W National Park

Its elevation is between 170 and 338 m. In addition, the buffer zones are the hunting zones of Mékrou , Djona  and Kompa , apart from transition areas in a  zone. This area in the West African savanna belt covers terrestrial, semi-aquatic and aquatic ecosystems. Primarily of semi-arid to semi-humid Sudanese wooded savanna, 500 plant species have been identified. Sudanese savanna fauna consists of 70 diurnal mammals and more than 112 species of fish including the monkfish Squatina aculeata. The park has about 200,000 people living within it and on its periphery, which creates conflicts between park managers, herders and farmers.

Pendjari National Park

The Pendjari National Park covers  entirely in the far north-west of Benin. It has buffer zones namely, the Pendjari (348,000 ha) that incorporates the hunting zones of Pendjari-Porga (76,000 ha), Batia (75,500 ha) and Konkombri (25,900 ha). Initially known as forest reserve, it was declared a national park on May 6, 1961, after the independence of Benin. In June 1986, it was classified as a MAB Biosphere Reserve (including the adjoining hunting zones of Pendjari and Atacora) and in February 2007, the Pendjari River Valley was recognized as a wetland of international importance and designated as a Ramsar site. The park is part of the W-Arli-Pendjari complex (WAP), which is a vast protected area in Benin, Burkina Faso and Niger. The hills and cliffs of the Atakora range make the north-west one of the most scenic areas of Benin. They provide a wonderful backdrop to the Pendjari National Park, which, in its isolation, remains one of the most interesting in West Africa.

Riparian forests

Riparian forests in Benin are important conservation sites that need more care than is currently available. These forests, which are flood-dependent and the flora that is dependent on this source of water, are seen in many parts of Benin. However, forest and savanna species are also part of this ecosystem as they have a combination of plants from various forest and savanna types. Hence, the riparian forests have been found to be more diverse than those of the single one-ecosystem-based vegetation. They also provide the needed categories of food for many animal and other forest species to survive.

The riparian forests ecosystem is in a limited area and spread in a linear shape. The forests account for at least one-third of the estimated 3,000 species of flora of Benin, with several valuable, rare or even endemic species. These forests are woodlands of semi-deciduous, dry, and open forest, and woodland savanna that occur along riverbanks or along streams. Adjacent more open ecosystems also affect the vegetation in these forests.

However, this ecosystem of hygrophile and edaphic freshwater forests is of general structural complexity and extent. It was in a state of extinction due to "shifting cultivation, grazing, selective cutting of valuable or rare tree species, road and dam construction, and over-exploitation of non-timber forest products" to meet the basic needs of rural community. This misuse also resulted in degradation of the ecosystem of rare plants and animals. It reached a chronic stage when indigenous multilayered plant communities became extinct in several areas with resultant creation of open fields, shrubs or grass savanna of least value. Thus, degradation of the ecologically rich system necessitated intervention at the Government level through enabling legislation to stop further damage to the ecosystem. The government of the Republic of Benin enacted a new forest law (no. 93-009) in July 1993, under which the uniqueness of riparian forests as refuge ecosystem for plant and wildlife of many kinds, was duly recognized. The rules enacted clearly defined that "clearance of wood and shrubs is not allowed within  at both sides of any waterway (article 28). Moreover, in the management plans of most forest reserves in Benin, gallery forests are to be left uncut, and rare species (e.g. Khaya spp. (Meliaceae), Milicia exelsa (Moraceae)) outside the gallery forests will not be cut either." In spite of such a legislation the enforcement is not effective as it is reported that uncontrolled and unplanned, mostly illegal utilisation of the forests resources continues, particularly in non-protected areas.

Fauna
The major faunal groups in Benin are mammals, birds and reptiles.

Mammals

Predators include: the lion (Panthera leo), the largest predator of Africa (found in both parks); the leopard (Panthera pardus) a secretive large African cat (found even outside the two parks); the cheetah (Acinonyx jubatus) is in the national parks but is a rare sight; several (Felis silvestris), a smaller cat; the caracal (Caracal caracal), the African wild cat (Felis sylvestris); the African hunting dog (Lycaon pictus) said to be in W. Park (may be extinct); side-striped jackal (Canis adustus); the black-backed jackal (Canis mesomelas); the spotted hyena (Crocuta crocuta) found in both parks.

Nocturnal predators include: the African civet (civettictis civetta) – a bulky long haired animal; small-spotted genet (Genetta genetta) and the large-spotted genet (Genetta tigrina) found in both parks; the spotted-necked otter (Lutra maculicollis), honey badger (Mellivora capensis); many mongoose species such as the marsh mongoose  (Atilax paludinosus), the Egyptian mongoose (Herpestes ichneumon), cusimanse (Crossarchus obscurus), the white-tailed mongoose (Ichneumia albicauda); slender or pygmy mongoose (Galerella sanguinea), solitary inhabitant of the savanna; and Gambian mongoose (mungos gambianus).

Mammals found here include: African bush elephant (loxodonta Africana) found widely in savannas, deserts, rainforest, and in the national parks; hippopotamus (Hippopotamus amphibius) found in rivers of both parks; the African buffalo (Syncerus caffer) an ox like animal in large herds in savannas and in smaller groups in parks; warthog (Phacochoerus africanus) in both parks; the aardvark (Orycteropus afer) insectivore found in savannas; pangolins; hedgehogs; porcupine species; rock hyrax (Procavia capensis); Cape ground squirrel (Xerus inauris).

The parks and other areas have a major population of antelope. 17 species are identified, out of which the endangered species are sitatunga (Tragelaphus spekii), bongo (Tragelaphus eurycerus) and korrigum (Damaliscus korrigum korrigum). Other species of various status are: grey duiker (Sylvicapra grimmia); bushbuck; Maxwell's duiker (Philantomba maxwellii); red-flanked duiker (Cephalophus rufilatus); black duiker (Cephalophus niger); yellow-backed duiker (Cephalophus silvicultor) (vulnerable); grey duiker (Sylvicapra grimmia); bohor reedbuck (Redunca redunca); waterbuck (Kobus ellipsiprymnus) found near water sources; Buffon's kob (Kobus kob); roan antelope (Hippotragus equinus) found more in both parks but more in Pendjari; western hartebeest (Alcelaphus buselaphus major) ungainly in appearance; red-fronted gazelle (Eudorcas rufifrons); and oribi (Ourebia ourebi), more abundant in Pendjari Park than in W National Park.

Primates reported include olive baboon (Papio anubis) of large size with inverted “U” shaped tail; the green monkey (Cercopithecus sabaeus), the most common monkey species; the common patas monkey (Erythrocebus patas) with an orange tinged coat occur in northern Benin.

Reptiles 
Nile crocodiles (Crocodylus niloticus), the largest living reptile, is seen in river banks and ponds in the two protected parks. There are also dwarf caimans, and chameleons in 100 colour variations. 
 
Tortoises include leopard tortoise (Stigmochelys pardalis), several species of terrapin and turtles – out of eight species of marine turtles four are found in Benin coast, namely, the green sea turtle (Chelonia mydas), olive ridley sea turtle (Lepidochelys olivacea) and leatherback sea turtle (Dermochelys coriacea). The indigenous hawksbill sea turtle (Eretmochelys imbricata) is the source of traditional tortoiseshell). 
 
Lizards found are harmless and of two types, the water and savanna monitors – Varanus niloticus and Varanus exanthematicus – both are predatory species; house gecko (Hemidactylus mabouia), a translucent white lizard; agama species in large size of varied mixed colours and the skinks.

Birds

Birds are a special feature in all types of habitats ranging from rainforest to deserts in Benin, which have two main climatic zones, namely the thick tropical vegetation in the south and the dry savannas and light woodlands in the north. The birding sites for coastal waders are the coastal lagoons of Les Bouches du Roi and the backwaters of Ouidha beach. Water birds and forest birds are found in Lake Nokoué and Lake Ahémé. Feathered birds are found in granite rock hills near Dassa-Zoume. The national parks are full of savanna specific birds.

The weaver species reported are: 12 species of weavers of family Ploceidae are found in Benin, out of the overall 111 of the genus Ploceus (true weavers) identified; they are larger than a sparrow, males are more colourful than female species. Other reported species are Holub's golden-weaver, southern masked weaver (Ploceus velatus), Vieillot's black weaver (Ploceus nigerrimus), black-billed weaver (Ploceus melanogaster), grosbeak weaver (Amblyospiza albifrons), sparrow and buffalo weavers dideric cuckoo (Chrysococcyx caprius), a handsome white-breasted cuckooshrike (Coracina pectoralis) which lays its eggs in weavers nests. More species of birds are: helmeted guineafowl (Numida meleagris), black-and-white-chicken-like cuckoo found in North Benin, Abyssinian ground hornbill (Bucorvus abyssinicus), a large distinctive bird; the marabou stork (Leptoptilos crumeniferus); the black crowned crane (Balearica pavonina), a tall grey-black bird; the saddle-billed stork (Ephippiorhynchus senegalensis), a large white bird with black wings.

Raptor species (mostly carion-eating birds) are found in both parks. A common sight is the African fish eagle (Haliaeetus vocifer), which is black and white.

Molluscs

Insects 

Insect species found in Benin include the tsetse fly and many vectors of epidemic diseases.

Flora 

Dense forests are not recorded in Benin. Along the coastal areas coconut, palmyra palms, oil palms are seen up to Abomey, where after vegetation is savanna merged with that of Guinea and Sudan. Other tree species noted are ebony, shea nut, kapok, fromager, and Senegal mahogany trees.

The W National Park constitutes the southern limit of tiger bush plateau distribution. Riverine and gallery forests are noted on the banks of the Mekrou River (with seasonal flows), and other tributaries of the Niger River. The plains have extensive coverage of grasses. In the savanna woodlands, grassland and stunted savanna woodlands, the plant species recorded are the Terminalia avicennioides,  Anogeissus leiocarpus, hackberry Clematis integrifolia clematis, Boscia senegalensis, Balanites aegyptiaca, kapok tree (Bombax costatum), African locust (Parkia biglobosa), camel's foot tree, Senna reticulata, baobab (Adansonia digitata), tamarind (Tamarindus indica), Prosopis africana, (Piliostigma reticulatum). In the evergreen gallery forests, sausage tree,  (Kigelia africana) and African mahogany (Khaya senegalensis) are found. Orchid species recorded are the Eulophia cucculata and Eulophia guineensis.

The Pendjari Park consists of; grasslands which have no trees or shrubs; shrub lands which are fully covered by grass; trees; wooded savanna formations with a herbaceous layer but with no undergrowth; forests along the river, thin forests with plenty of trees of size of 8–16 m; and gallery forests which are dense with shrubs. The rocky cliffs of the Pendjari National Park are sparsely wooded. The Volta depression has savanna ecosystem with woodlands and rare species such as Burkea africana, Anogeissus leiocarpus, Pterocarpus erinaceus, Detarium microcarpum, Lannea acida, Sterculia setigera, Combretum ghasalense and Acacia spp. On the deep soils of some of the summits and the Atakora escarpment one finds a greater variety of plant species with Isoberlinia doka and Afzelia africana. The Pendjari River has an impressive gallery forest and river forest. The park includes both Sudan and North Guinea savannas, with areas of grassland dominated by Acacia sieberiana and Terminalia macroptera.

The most common species found in the "riparian forests" are: Pterocarpus santalinoides (Papilionaceae), Cola laurifolia (Sterculiaceae) and Syzygium guineense (Myrtaceae), out of which a few species are endemic and valuable.

Herbal cure
Malaria, which is a virulent disease in Benin as in the rest of Africa, is treated by herbal medicines. The treatments practiced in southern Benin are based on plant species that are extracted and administered orally or through bathing. There are 85 plant species which are used to make 35 mixtures for treatment.

Botanical garden
The diversity of plants in Western Africa is preserved at the Papatia Botanical Garden in northern Benin. This garden, which is spread over 12 ha, is a species-rich savanna area where a hundred woody plants and several hundred herbaceous species have been maintained. A tree-nursery is part of this garden created to increase rare species.

Organizations
According to the Strategic Plan for the Conservation and Management of Protected Areas approved in 1994, organization such as the National Centre for Wildlife Management (or Centre National de Gestion des Réserves de la Faune – CENAGREF) was created in 1996 for the sole purpose of the conservation and management of national parks including the buffer zones and the transition areas. The Direction of Pendjari National Park set up in 1996 and the Direction of W National Park set up in 1999 are administrative organizations under the CENAGREF that are responsible for the management of the parks. The Association of Civil Communities in the Protected Areas of the W National Park and the Séri Zone (Association des Communes Riveraines aux Aires Protégées du Parc W et de la Zone de Séri – ACRAP/WS) and Village Associations for the Management of Wildlife Reserves (or Associations Villageoise de Gestion des Reserves de Faune -AVIGREF) were also set up with the responsibility community training and promoting multi-level communication between farmers and other stakeholders and capacity building and the development of effective governance following decentralized resource management. IUCN has associated with these organizations to address all aspects of management of the natural resources of the W National Park.

Notes

References

External links

Biota of Benin
Benin